Luis Eduardo Guifarro Pinto (born 25 August 1976) is a former Honduran football player who played for F.C. Motagua, Marathón, Real España and Real Juventud.

He is currently a coach for Academia De Fútbol Chamaco Guifarro.

Club career
He started his career at F.C. Motagua in 1997. He won the 1997-98 Apertura and Clausura and 1999-2000 Apertura and Clausura with Motagua, scoring 4 goals. Since 2000 to 2006 played for C.D. Marathón. There he won 2001-02 Clausura, 2002-03 Clausura, and 2004-05 Apertura. In 2006, he moved to Real C.D. España for the 2006-07 Honduran Liga Nacional, where he became champion of the 2006-07 Clausura. In 2009, he returned to active football playing for Real Juventud. He retired in 2010 and is actually a manager.

International career
Guifarro made his debut for Honduras in a November 1998 friendly match against El Salvador and has earned a total of 14 caps, scoring no goals. He has represented his country at the 2003 and 2005 CONCACAF Gold Cups.

His final international was a July 2005 CONCACAF Gold Cup match against the USA.

Personal life
He is a son of former Honduran international Rubén Guifarro.

References

External links

1976 births
Living people
Sportspeople from Tegucigalpa
Association football midfielders
Honduran footballers
Honduras international footballers
F.C. Motagua players
C.D. Marathón players
Real C.D. España players
C.D. Real Juventud players
Liga Nacional de Fútbol Profesional de Honduras players